The Jerusalem derby refers to football matches between Jerusalem-based teams Beitar Jerusalem and Hapoel Jerusalem. The teams have met on 69 separate occasions, 57 of which were in the league, 6 in the State Cup, two in the Toto Cup and one Exhibition game in 1969 that Hapoel win. Beitar Jerusalem has been the more dominant side in the derby, with 31 wins, while Hapoel Jerusalem won 15 times.

The derby, which was formerly more popular, lost some of its relevance as Hapoel Jerusalem were relegated to the lower leagues in the 1999–2000 Israeli Premier League, which was the last time both teams have met.

Hapoel Jerusalem finished second place in the 2020–21 Liga Leumit and were promoted to the 2021–22 Israeli Premier League, where they will play Beitar Jerusalem in the derby once again, with the first match between them scheduled to be played in the 2021–22 Toto Cup Al.

Historically, Hapoel were the superior side before the 1970s, however since the 1970s, Beitar has won several honors including six Israeli football championships and seven state cups.

References

Football derbies in Israel
Beitar Jerusalem F.C.
Hapoel Jerusalem F.C.
Football in Israel